The Long Island Ocelot Club (LIOC) is an organization that promotes lawful ownership and responsible management of non-domestic felines in the private sector with special emphasis on the smaller species such as ocelot, serval, bobcat, lynx, and caracal.

History
The Long Island Ocelot Club was founded in 1956 by Catherine Cisin.  In 1979, the organization was incorporated as "LIOC - Endangered Species Conservation Federation."  By  2002, the organization changed its name to the present "Feline Conservation Federation".  A group of members split off, and re-formed the "Long Island Ocelot Club", a completely separate organization mostly focused on the smaller species.

Communication and Activities
The Long Island Ocelot Club publishes a bi-monthly newsletter, hosts a private Yahoo chat list and web site. An annual convention is offered in August and locations are rotated around the country (United States).

References

External links
Long Island Ocelot Club website
Feline Conservation Federation website

Organizations based in New York (state)
1956 establishments in New York (state)